The Impuls IC is a German high-wing, single-place, hang glider that was designed and produced by Impuls of Munich.

The aircraft is no longer in production.

Design and development
The Impuls IC was designed as the company's attempt to create an intermediate hang glider which would be a natural progressive step for students from its beginner wings. The IC is certified as DHV Class 2.

The aircraft is made from aluminum tubing, with the wing covered in Dacron sailcloth. Its  span wing is cable braced from a single kingpost. The nose angle is 126° and the aspect ratio is 6.7:1.

The IC sold for €3950 in 2003.

Specifications (IC)

References

Hang gliders